Austramathes purpurea is a species of moth in the family Noctuidae. It is endemic to New Zealand and can be found throughout the North and South Islands but has yet to be recorded at Stewart Island. It inhabits native forest. This species might possibly be confused with A. pessota, however this latter species does not have the purple hue to the forewings. The larvae of A. purpurea feed primarily on māhoe but have been recorded as feeding on, and have been reared on, narrow-leaved māhoe. The larvae pupate in a silken cocoon on moss covered ground. Adults can be found on the wing during the months of March to January but mainly occur during New Zealand's late autumn, winter, and spring. Light trapping may not be the most efficient technique for collecting this species.

Taxonomy
This species was first described by Arthur Gardiner Butler in 1879 and named Graphiphora purpurea. In 1887 Edward Meyrick, thinking he was describing a new species, again named this moth Xanthia ceramodes. Having realised his error, in 1888 Meyrick synonymised this name but placed the species within the Xanthia genus. In 1906 George Hampson described the new genus Austramathes and placed this species within it so it is now known as Austramathes purpurea. In 2017 Robert Hoare undertook revision of the New Zealand Noctuinae and confirmed this placement. The male holotype specimen was collected by F. W. Hutton in Dunedin and is held at the Natural History Museum, London.

Description 

The larvae of this species are green with orange, black, yellow and pink markings. George Hudson described it as follows:

Butler originally described this species as follows:

Hudson also described the species in his 1898 book New Zealand moths and butterflies (Macro-lepidoptera) as:

The wingspan of the adult male A. purpurea is between 29 and 37mm where as the wingspan of the female is between 29 and 42mm. This species might possibly be confused with A. pessota, however this latter species does not have the purple hue to the forewings.

Distribution 
A. purpurea is endemic to New Zealand, and found in both the North and the South Islands but has yet to be recorded at Stewart Island.

Habitat 
This species prefers native forest as its habitat.

Behaviour
The larvae of this species pupate in a silken cocoon on moss covered ground or alternatively within gaps in bark. Adults can be found on the wing during the months of March to January but mainly occur during New Zealand's late autumn, winter and spring.

Host species 

The larvae of A. purpurea feed primarily on māhoe but have been recorded as feeding on, and have also been reared on, narrow-leaved māhoe.

Collection method 
Although the adults of this species are nocturnal and are attracted to light, Robert Hoare has hypothesised that light trapping may not be the most efficient technique for collecting this species.

References

 

Cuculliinae
Moths described in 1879
Moths of New Zealand
Endemic fauna of New Zealand
Taxa named by Arthur Gardiner Butler
Endemic moths of New Zealand